William R. Schreiber (born November 11, 1941) was a Minnesota politician and a member of the Minnesota House of Representatives. Schreiber was born in Minneapolis, Minnesota. His wife Lona Minne also served in the Minnesota Legislature.

References

External links

1941 births
Living people
Politicians from Minneapolis
Republican Party members of the Minnesota House of Representatives